Tera Klutz (born 1975/1976) is an American Certified Public Accountant serving as the auditor of Indiana. She was appointed to the position after her predecessor, Suzanne Crouch resigned to become Lieutenant Governor of Indiana in January, 2017.

Early life and education
Born and raised in Fort Wayne, Indiana, Klutz graduated from Elmhurst High School as the valedictorian of her graduating class. Klutz earned her bachelor's degree in accounting from Indiana University – Purdue University Fort Wayne.

Career 
Klutz is a certified public accountant who worked as an accountant and auditor with both PricewaterhouseCoopers and Crowe Global. She won election as the auditor of Allen County, Indiana in 2010 and won re-election in 2014. Before becoming county auditor, Klutz served as Allen County's Chief Deputy Auditor under Lisa Borgmann from 2002 to 2010. From 2013 through 2016, Klutz was active with Association of Indiana Counties’ Legislative Committee. As Chair, she oversaw and directed the Association's legislative priorities by assisting in the analysis and review of proposed legislation and regularly testified before committees of the Indiana General Assembly.

Appointment
Klutz was appointed by Governor-elect Eric Holcomb on January 2, 2017. She was sworn in on January 9, 2017. She is the first certified public accountant to be Indiana auditor. Nick Jordan, her chief deputy auditor, replaced her as Allen County auditor.

Tenure
Klutz promised that she will continue to focus on internal controls and increasing transparency through use of technology. On July 19, 2017, Klutz announced that Indiana had a $42 million surplus and reserves of nearly $1.8 billion.

Personal life
Tera is married to Zach Klutz. They have two daughters.

Awards
Recipient of the 2016 Outstanding County Auditor of the Year award

References

21st-century American politicians
21st-century American women politicians
County auditors in the United States
Indiana Republicans
Indiana State Auditors
Indiana University – Purdue University Fort Wayne alumni
Living people
Politicians from Fort Wayne, Indiana
Women in Indiana politics
Year of birth missing (living people)